Evans Creek is a stream in Coshocton and Tuscarawas counties in the U.S. state of Ohio. It is a tributary of the Tuscarawas River.

Evans Creek was named for Isaac Evans, who built a sawmill there.

See also
List of rivers of Ohio

References

Rivers of Coshocton County, Ohio
Rivers of Tuscarawas County, Ohio
Rivers of Ohio